Osmancık is a town in Çorum Province in the Black Sea region of Turkey, located 59 km north of the city of Çorum. It is the seat of Osmancık District. Its population is 30,537 (2022).

Geography
Located on an important crossing of the River Kızılırmak on the ancient Silk Road to the orient, Osmancık has long had a strategic value, and is still today a popular stopping-place on the road from Istanbul to the Black Sea city of Samsun and further east.

Today, Osmancık is known for its rice production, being especially suitable for a new strain of rice developed especially for the region by the Turkish Ministry of Agriculture and named "Osmancık-97."

The North Anatolian Fault zone runs through the valley, making Osmancık very vulnerable to earthquakes.

The town consists of 18 quarters: Gemici, Güney, Kızılırmak, Ulucami, Yazı, Yeni, Yeşilçatma, Şenyurt, Gürleyik, Temençe, Karapınar, Çiftlikler, Cumhuriyet, Çay, Esentepe, Eymir, Hıdırlık and Koyunbaba.

History
The area was settled by the Kayı clan of the Oghuz Turks as they migrated westwards into Anatolia from their heartland of Central Asia. Osmancık was one of the important destination points in the Ottoman period. Because of a number of earthquakes the city could not keep its ancient architecture. In the last century, there have been 4-5 heavy earthquakes. Being on the path of the Kızılırmak made the city an important settlement point since early history. Osmancık was known as Pimolisa during Roman and Byzantine eras. From 1867 until 1922, Osmancık was part of Angora vilayet.

Population

Notable natives
Osmancıklı İmamzade Halil Pasha, 15th-century Ottoman statesman, in the court of Mehmed I
Osmancıklı (Amasyalı) Koca Mehmed Nizamüddin Pasha, 15th-century Ottoman statesman
Pakçemüezzin Baltacı Mehmet Pasha, 18th-century Ottoman statesman, rumored to have been a lover of Catherine I of Russia
General Ahmet Çörekçi, Former Head Commander of Turkish Air Force
Gürkan Coşkun a.k.a. "Komet" - Famous Turkish artist
Bilal Kısa, Turkish football player, still playing for Galatasaray SK

Places of interest
In the village of Ardıç, to the west of Osmancık, there is a road cut by the Ancient Romans through a rock named Çalınkaya
Koyunbaba Bridge over the Kızılırmak, built in 1489 
The Seljuk Turk castle of Kandiber, in the town center 
The Ottoman period tomb of Sufi mystic Koyunbaba
The Trojan war hero Achilles was said to have been finally buried on the hill of Adatepe

External links
Municipality's official website
Osmancikgundem.com - City News Portal
Osmancık Haber - Weekly Local Newspaper
Osmancık - Weekly Local Newspaper

References 

 
Populated places in Çorum Province
Osmancık District